The 1946 Princeton Tigers football team was an American football team that represented Princeton University in the Ivy League during the 1946 college football season. In its second season under head coach Charlie Caldwell, the team compiled a 3–5 record and was outscored by a total of 130 to 104. Princeton played its 1946 home games at Palmer Stadium in Princeton, New Jersey.

Schedule

References

Princeton
Princeton Tigers football seasons
Princeton Tigers football